Jack S. Horsley (born September 25, 1951) is an American former competition swimmer and Olympic medalist.  He represented the United States as a 17-year-old at the 1968 Summer Olympics in Mexico City, where he won a bronze medal in the 200-meter backstroke, finishing behind East German Roland Matthes and fellow American Mitch Ivey.

Horsley was born in Salt Lake City, Utah, and attended high school in Seattle, Washington.  He enrolled in Indiana University, where he swam for coach Doc Counsilman's Indiana Hoosiers swimming and diving team in National Collegiate Athletic Association (NCAA) and Big Ten Conference competition.

He graduated from Indiana University with a bachelor's degree, and earned his medical degree from the University of Cincinnati Medical School.  He completed his residency in Stockton, California, and has lived in Ellensburg, Washington since 1979.  Horsley is currently the medical director of Central Washington University's student health center.  Horsley is a Latter-day Saint.

See also
 List of Indiana University (Bloomington) people
 List of Olympic medalists in swimming (men)

References

External links
 
 
  Student Medical & Counseling Clinic – Central Washington University medical staff profile

1951 births
Living people
Latter Day Saints from Washington (state)
American male backstroke swimmers
Indiana Hoosiers men's swimmers
Olympic bronze medalists for the United States in swimming
Sportspeople from Salt Lake City
Swimmers at the 1968 Summer Olympics
University of Cincinnati College of Medicine alumni
Medalists at the 1968 Summer Olympics
People from Ellensburg, Washington
Highline High School alumni
20th-century American people
21st-century American people